The Cruise of the Hellion is a 1927 American silent drama film directed by Duke Worne and starring Donald Keith, Edna Murphy and Tom Santschi.

Cast
 Donald Keith as Jack Harlan 
 Edna Murphy as Diana Drake 
 Tom Santschi as Kilroy 
 Sheldon Lewis as Capt. Drake 
 Sailor Sharkey as Reid 
 Charles K. French as John Harlan 
 Francis Ford as Peg-leg

References

Bibliography
 Munden, Kenneth White. The American Film Institute Catalog of Motion Pictures Produced in the United States, Part 1. University of California Press, 1997.

External links
 

1927 films
1927 drama films
1920s English-language films
American silent feature films
Silent American drama films
American black-and-white films
Films directed by Duke Worne
Rayart Pictures films
1920s American films